CM Labs Simulations is a private company established in Montreal in 2001. CM Labs is the developer of the Vortex simulation platform. The Vortex platform is composed of applications for creating interactive vehicle and mechanical equipment simulations in virtual environments. Vortex simulates rigid body dynamics, collision detection, contact determination, and dynamic reactions. CM Labs also manufactures crane and heavy equipment simulators based on Vortex technology.

History 
The company that was to become CM Labs Simulations was founded as Lateral Logic Inc. in 1994 by Jussi Westergren, Karsten Howes, and Frederic Francis. The company was focused on ground vehicle visual simulation systems, and the development of software toolkits for physics simulation. They released the Lateral Collision Engine (LCE) in 1998, targeting research and enterprise clients.

Lateral Logic was acquired by MathEngine PLC in April 1999 and was renamed Critical Mass Systems. MathEngine's original Dynamics Toolkit and Collision Toolkit were developed in part by Critical Mass Systems, and were targeted for a broad range of gaming, research, and academic markets through 2001.

In 2001, MathEngine spun off Critical Mass Systems business as CM Labs Simulations, consisting of the CM office in Montreal and a portion of MathEngine's technology, renamed Vortex. Vortex has been under active development ever since the initial launch of the software in 2001.

While MathEngine's remaining technology, itself renamed Karma, became fully absorbed into the Unreal and RenderWare game engines, CM Labs shifted its focus away from gaming to the visual simulation for training (VST) market, targeting Vortex at robotics and heavy-equipment operator training in both commercial and military applications.

Clients
CM Labs clients reportedly include FMC Schilling Robotics, iRobot, Honda Research, L3 Technologies, Lockheed Martin, NASA, and Carnegie Mellon University.

References

External links
 CM Labs Simulations homepage

Companies based in Montreal
Software companies of Canada
Simulation software